Cossack was launched in 1812 in Sunderland and first appeared in Lloyd's Register (LR) in 1813.

Cossack, Black, master, a brig of Greenock, had been sailing from Alicante to Newfoundland when on 16 October 1814 the privateer Grand Turk captured her. Grand Turk transferred a considerable quantity of raisins from Cossack before sending her for the United States.

 recaptured Cossack, only to have Cossack fall prey to the US privateer . Cossack arrived at Salem, Massachusetts on 16 November. Cossack was carrying a cargo of wine. She was sold at Salem for $12,500. 

When Captain Green, of Grand Turk reached Salem he was delighted to see Cossack anchored there. He was then chagrined to discover that she had become a prize to a rival privateer. 

The Register of Shipping (RS) carried the annotation "CAPTURED" by Cossacks name in its volume for 1815.

Citations

References
 
 

1812 ships
Age of Sail merchant ships of England
Captured ships